Farkhod Kuralov (born 18 October 1993) is a Tajikistani middle-distance runner. He competed in the 800 metres event at the 2014 IAAF World Indoor Championships. In 2016, he tested positive for Stanozolol and was banned from competition for four years between 13 June 2016 and 28 June 2020.

Competition record

References

External links
 

1993 births
Living people
Tajikistani male middle-distance runners
Place of birth missing (living people)
Athletes (track and field) at the 2010 Asian Games
Athletes (track and field) at the 2014 Asian Games
Doping cases in athletics
Asian Games competitors for Tajikistan
Competitors at the 2011 Summer Universiade
Competitors at the 2013 Summer Universiade